Muscle soreness may refer to: 

 Acute muscle soreness (AMS), which appears during or immediately after exercise and lasts up to 24 hours.
 Delayed onset muscle soreness (DOMS), which reaches its peak point from 24 to 72 hours after the exercise.